The Mubarak Mosque is a mosque in Phú Tân District of An Giang Province, Vietnam. It is said to be built in 1750 and renovated in 1808. It is one of the oldest mosques of the Muslim community of Cham people.

See also 
List of mosques in Vietnam
Islam in Vietnam

References 

Buildings and structures in An Giang province
Mosques in Vietnam
Mosques completed in 1750